was the Japanese founder of Seitai. He established the concept of taiheki.

Students 
 Itsuo Tsuda
 Masatomi Ikeda

Books 
Among his many books, three are now available in English translation.
 Order, Spontaneity and the Body by Haruchika Noguchi. Tokyo, Japan, Zensei, 1985, paperback. .
 Colds and their Benefits by Haruchika Noguchi. Tokyo, Japan, Zensei, 1986, paperback. .
 Scolding and Praising by Haruchika Noguchi. Tokyo, Japan, Zensei, 1991, paperback. . Seitai Inteligencia Vital de Laura López Coto. 2015  (castellano)

External links 
 Seitai Kyokai translation
Zensei-sha His publishing company. Three of his books in English translation are available.
Itsuo Tsuda School
Seitai Inteligencia Vital, Books and Seitai Divulgation in Spain
Yukido - Seitai and bone-setting

References 

1911 births
1976 deaths
People in alternative medicine
People from Tokyo
Traditional Japanese medicine